Belgium competed at the 2016 Summer Paralympics in Rio de Janeiro, Brazil, from 7 to 18 September 2016.

Medalists

The following Belgian competitors won medals at the games. In the by discipline sections below, medalists' names are bolded.

Administration

Olek Kazimirowski served as Chef de Mission.

Disability classifications

Every participant at the Paralympics has their disability grouped into one of five disability categories; amputation, the condition may be congenital or sustained through injury or illness; cerebral palsy; wheelchair athletes, there is often overlap between this and other categories; visual impairment, including blindness; Les autres, any physical disability that does not fall strictly under one of the other categories, for example dwarfism or multiple sclerosis. Each Paralympic sport then has its own classifications, dependent upon the specific physical demands of competition. Events are given a code, made of numbers and letters, describing the type of event and classification of the athletes competing. Some sports, such as athletics, divide athletes by both the category and severity of their disabilities, other sports, for example swimming, group competitors from different categories together, the only separation being based on the severity of the disability.

Athletics

Men
Track & road events

Women
Track & road events

Field events

Boccia 

Belgium qualified for the 2016 Summer Paralympics in this sport at the Guilford hosted 2015 Boccia European Team And Pairs Championships, London in the BC3 Pair event.  They claimed gold ahead of silver medalist Greece and bronze medalists Spain.  They scored 7 - 1 against Spain in the gold medal match.

Cycling 

With one pathway for qualification being one highest ranked NPCs on the UCI Para-Cycling male and female Nations Ranking Lists on 31 December 2014, Belgium qualified for the 2016 Summer Paralympics in Rio, assuming they continued to meet all other eligibility requirements.

Road 

Men

Women

Track 

Pursuit

Time trial

Equestrian 
The country qualified to participate in the team event at the Rio Games.

Swimming 

Men

Women

Table tennis 

Men

Wheelchair tennis 
Belgium qualified two competitors in the men's single event. Joachim Gerard qualified via the standard route. Mike Denayer qualified via a Doubles World Ranking Allocation place.

Men

See also
Belgium at the 2016 Summer Olympics

References

Nations at the 2016 Summer Paralympics
2016
2016 in Belgian sport